The following lists events that happened in 1928 in Iceland.

Incumbents
Monarch – Kristján X
Prime Minister – Tryggvi Þórhallsson

Events
 Scheduled air travel to Akureyri Airport started
1928 Úrvalsdeild

Births
18 February – Tom Johnson, ice hockey player (d. 2007)
22 June – Steingrímur Hermannsson, politician (d. 2010)
22 September – Bryndís Pétursdóttir, actress (d. 2020) 
8 November – Haukur Clausen, short-distance runner and dentist (d. 2003).
8 November – Örn Clausen, athlete (d. 2008).

Full date missing
Gerður Helgadóttir, sculptor and stained glass artist (d.1975)

Deaths

References

 
1920s in Iceland
Iceland
Iceland
Years of the 20th century in Iceland